Howard Shu (born November 28, 1990) is an American badminton player. Shu began playing badminton at age 8. His father, who played in Taiwan, encouraged Shu to join him at local badminton clubs, and entered him into the Junior Nationals. Shu competed at the 2016 Summer Olympics in Rio de Janeiro, Brazil.

Achievements

Pan American Games 
Men's singles

Mixed doubles

Pan Am Championships 
Men's singles

Mixed doubles

BWF Grand Prix (1 runner-up) 
The BWF Grand Prix had two levels, the Grand Prix and Grand Prix Gold. It was a series of badminton tournaments sanctioned by the Badminton World Federation (BWF) and played between 2007 and 2017.

Mixed doubles

  BWF Grand Prix Gold tournament
  BWF Grand Prix tournament

BWF International Challenge/Series (10 titles, 9 runners-up) 
Men's singles

Mixed doubles

  BWF International Challenge tournament
  BWF International Series tournament
  BWF Future Series tournament

References

External links 
 
 
 
 
 United States Olympic Committee

1990 births
Living people
Sportspeople from Orange County, California
American male badminton players
American sportspeople of Chinese descent
American people of Taiwanese descent
Badminton players at the 2016 Summer Olympics
Olympic badminton players of the United States
Badminton players at the 2015 Pan American Games
Badminton players at the 2019 Pan American Games
Pan American Games bronze medalists for the United States
Pan American Games medalists in badminton
Medalists at the 2015 Pan American Games
Medalists at the 2019 Pan American Games